Sonja Kovač (born 18 June 1984) is a Croatian actress, model and singer.

Filmography

Television roles

References

External links 

1984 births
Croatian actresses
People from Bjelovar
Living people
21st-century Croatian women singers
Croatian female models